These are the Kowloon West results of the 2012 Hong Kong legislative election. The election was held on 9 September 2012 and all 5 seats in Kowloon West where consisted of Yau Tsim Mong District, Sham Shui Po District and Kowloon City District were contested. Ann Chiang replacing Starry Lee who contested the District Council (Second) functional constituency stood for the largest pro-Beijing party Democratic Alliance for the Betterment and Progress of Hong Kong. Association for Democracy and People's Livelihood's Tam Kwok-kiu replacing Frederick Fung who contested the new super seats as well, however lost to his ally Civic Party's Claudia Mo who was not elected in 2008. The ADPL once again lost all the seats in this stronghold since the 1998 election.

Overall results
Before election:

Change in composition:

Candidates list

Results by districts

Opinion polling

See also
Legislative Council of Hong Kong
Hong Kong legislative elections
2012 Hong Kong legislative election

References

2012 Hong Kong legislative election